Euriamis Losada (born October 23, 1983) is a Cuban American actor.

Filmography

Film

TV shows

References

External links
 

1983 births
Living people
American male film actors
American male television actors
Male actors from Miami
Hispanic and Latino American male actors